New Brunswick is one of Canada's three provinces of the Maritimes, and the only officially bilingual province (French and English) in the country. The provincial Department of Finance estimates that the province's population in 2006 was 729,997 of which the majority is English-speaking but with a substantial French-speaking minority of mostly Acadian origin.

First Nations in New Brunswick include the Mi'kmaq and Wolastoqiyik (Maliseet). The first European settlers, the Acadians are descendants of French settlers and also some of the Indigenous peoples of Acadia, a French colony in what is today Nova Scotia. The Acadians were expelled by the British (1755) for refusing to take an oath of allegiance to King George II which drove several thousand Acadian residents into exile in North America, the UK and France during the French and Indian War. (Those American Acadians who wound up in Louisiana, and other parts of the American South, are often referred to as Cajuns, although some Cajuns are not of Acadian origin.) In time, some Acadians returned to the Maritime provinces of Canada, mainly to New Brunswick, due to the British prohibiting them from resettling their lands and villages in what became Nova Scotia.

Many of the English-Canadian population of New Brunswick are descended from Loyalists who fled the American Revolution. This is commemorated in the province's motto, Spem reduxit ("hope was restored"). There is also a significant population with Irish ancestry, especially in Saint John and the Miramichi Valley. People of Scottish descent are scattered throughout the province, with higher concentrations in the Miramichi and in Campbellton. A small population of Danish origin may be found in New Denmark in the northwest of the province.

Population history

Source: Statistics Canada

Population geography

City Metropolitan Areas

Cities and towns

Ethnic origin
The information at the left is from Statistics Canada  
Percentages add to more than 100% because of dual responses e.g. "Danish-Canadian" generates an entry in both the category "Danish" and the category "Canadian". Groups with more than 3,000 responses are included.

Of the 233,000 New Brunswickers whose mother tongue is French, the great majority are Acadians. Most have indicated their ethnic origin as French and not as Acadian, so that the number of Acadians shown is much smaller.

Visible minorities and Aboriginals

Languages

Compared to other provinces, New Brunswick has a relatively even split of French and English population.

As a comparison, the minority language communities of Ontario and Quebec (Franco-Ontarians and English-speaking Quebecers respectively) make up less than 10% of those provinces' populations. With both official language communities so strongly represented, New Brunswick is home  to both French and English language hospitals and healthcare networks, school systems, universities, and media. The province also has a relatively high proportion of people who state that they can speak both official languages, with about 246,000 people, or 33.2% of the population reporting the ability to speak both English and French (though Francophones make up two-thirds of those who are bilingual).

Language policy remains a perennial issue in New Brunswick society and politics. Recurring debates have arisen in regards to interpretation of the provincial bilingualism policy, duality (the system of parallel French and English speaking public services), and specifics of implementation. The extent of the provincial policy on bilingualism means that a new row is never far off in the New Brunswick news cycle. The French-speaking community continues to advocate for full funding of French-language public services and fair representation in public sector employment, while some Anglophones (and Francophones) fear that the system of duality is financially inefficient and its extent is not worthwhile, or that the provincial governments targets for bilingualism in public employment are hurting their chances to work for the government, as Anglophones are less likely than Francophones to be proficient enough in both official languages to use them in employment.

The province's bilingual status is enshrined in both provincial and federal law. The Canadian Constitution makes specific mention of New Brunswick's bilingual status and defines the spirit of implementation as one based on both community and individual rights (in contrast with the constitutional protections for the other provinces that is limited to individuals, though this extends to "community" issues in terms of provision of schooling etc.). The Canadian Charter of Rights and Freedoms has a number of New Brunswick specific articles and makes specific mention of New Brunswick in each section relating to language (ex. Section 18 has two paragraphs, the first regarding bilingual publication of the Canadian Parliaments work and laws, the second specifying that New Brunswick's legislature will publish its work in both French and English). Of particular interest is Article 16.1, which declares that the French and English speaking communities of New Brunswick have equal rights and privileges, including community specific educational and cultural institutions. This specific distinction of linguistic community is important in that it recognizes not only the rights of individuals to use their language, but also demands that the two official language communities have their specific institutions upheld.

In 2012, New Brunswick francophones scored lower on the Programme for the International Assessment of Adult Competencies than their anglophone counterparts in New Brunswick.

Knowledge of languages 

The question on knowledge of languages allows for multiple responses. The following figures are from the 2021 Canadian Census, and lists languages that were selected by at least 0.5 per cent of respondents.

Mother tongue 
New Brunswick's official languages are shown in bold. Figures shown are for the number of single-language responses and the percentage of total single-language responses. During the 19th century Scottish Gaelic was also spoken in the Campbellton and Dalhousie area. The language died out as a natively-spoken language in the province in the early 20th century.

The 2011 Canadian census showed a population of 751,171. Of the 731,855 single responses to the census question concerning mother tongue, the most commonly reported languages were:

Note: "n.i.e.": not included elsewhere

There were also 45 single-language responses for Gujarati; 135 for Niger-Congo languages n.i.e.; 70 for Creole; 95 for Non-verbal languages (Sign languages); 115 for Japanese; 30 for Indo-Iranian languages n.i.e.; 5 for Somali; 20 for Sinhala (Sinhalese); and 40 for Malayalam. New Brunswick's official languages are shown in bold. (Figures shown are for the number of single language responses and the percentage of total single-language responses.)

Religion

Migration

Immigration 

The 2021 census reported that immigrants (individuals born outside Canada) comprise 44,125 persons or 5.8 percent of the total population of New Brunswick.

Recent immigration 
The 2021 Canadian census counted a total of 16,040 people who immigrated to New Brunswick between 2016 and 2021.

Interprovincial migration

New Brunswick has typically experienced less emigration than its size and economic situation would suggest, probably because of the low rate of emigration of its francophone population.

Source: Statistics Canada

See also

Demographics of Canada
Population of Canada by province and territory

References

New Brunswick
New Brunswick society